Benjamin Philip Barclay (born 7 October 1996) is an English professional footballer who plays as a centre-back for  club Carlisle United on loan from Stockport County. As well as a centre back, Barclay can also play in the defensive midfield role.

Career

Brighton & Hove Albion
Barclay played regularly for Brighton U23's and made a number of appearances for the Sussex club in the Premier League 2 league prior to his inclusion to the senior squad. The former Manchester City youth player was included in Chris Hughton's 25-man squad for the 2018–19 Premier League season. He made his Brighton and professional debut on 29 August 2018, starting and playing the whole match of the 1–0 home loss against fellow Premier League outfit Southampton in the EFL Cup, with Charlie Austin scoring the late winner.

Notts County (loan)
On 4 January 2019, Barclay joined Notts County on loan until the end of the season. Barclay made his Notts County debut a day after joining the club in a League Two fixture away against Essex side Colchester United where it eventually finished 3–3, in what also happened to be his first ever league match. On 19 April 2019 Barclay scored his first ever professional goal scoring in the 90+4 minute in a 2–1 home defeat to MK Dons. In the next match, which was away to Crawley, Barclay was sent off for violent conduct. He was sent off at 1–1, the scoreline it finished. As a result of the suspension he missed the final two games of the season where Notts County were relegated to the National League after a 3–1 away defeat to Swindon Town in the final game of the season.

Departure from The Albion

He was released from Brighton at the end of the 2018–19 season.

Accrington Stanley
On 16 July 2019 Barclay joined Accrington Stanley on a one-year contract with the option of a further year. He made his debut for Stanley on 13 August, coming in the EFL Cup starting in midfield where it finished 3–1 to Sunderland at the Crown Ground. Barclay made his league debut for Accy on 16 November, starting in the centre of midfield in a 1–0 away defeat to Rotherham United He made eight league appearances in his first season for the Lancashire-based side including a 1–0 away win over local rivals Blackpool on Boxing Day 2019 before the league being suspended in March 2020 due to Coronavirus.

On Barclay's fourth league game of the 2020–21 season he started and played the whole match helping keep a clean sheet in a 2–0 home victory over League One leaders Hull City on 26 January 2021. He scored his first Stanley goal with a powerful header putting Accrington back level in an eventual 3–1 away loss to relegation threatened Rochdale on 17 April. He played 21 times in the league, scoring once – 26 appearances and one goal in all competitions – in his second season at the club, including the 1–0 away win against Portsmouth on the final day of the season, knocking Pompey out of the play-offs with Accrington finishing in 11th place. Barclay was offered a new deal by the club at the end of the season. However, he departed the club making 36 appearances scoring once in all competitions after two years at Stanley.

Stockport County
On 2 August 2021, Barclay signed a three-year deal with National League side Stockport County. He made his debut on the 22 August, starting and playing the whole match in the 3–1 home loss against Dagenham & Redbridge on the opening game of the 2021–22 season. Barclay came on as an extra time substitute in the 5–3 FA Cup first round replay victory over Bolton on 17 November, knocking out the League One side. Six days later, again coming on from the bench, he scored his first goal for The Hatters, scoring Stockport's fourth in an eventual 5–0 home thrashing over King's Lynn.

Yeovil Town (loan)

On 28 January 2022, Barclay joined fellow National League side Yeovil Town on a one-month loan deal. A day later he made his debut for The Glovers, playing the full match helping keep a clean sheet in the 1–0 away win over Woking. Barclay scored his first goal for Yeovil on 19 March, opening the scoreline in an eventual 2–0 away win over Dover Athletic, a result that relegated the troubled Kent side to the National League South.

Carlisle United (loan)
On 4 July 2022, Barclay signed for Carlisle United on loan until the end of the 2022–23 season.

Career statistics

Honours
Stockport County
National League: 2021–22

References

1996 births
Living people
English footballers
Association football defenders
Brighton & Hove Albion F.C. players
Notts County F.C. players
Accrington Stanley F.C. players
Stockport County F.C. players
Yeovil Town F.C. players
Carlisle United F.C. players
English Football League players
National League (English football) players